The Castra of Izbășești was a fort made of earth in the Roman province of Dacia. Erected and abandoned at an uncertain date, the fort was part of the Limes Transalutanus.  Traces of the one time earthwork can be identified on the Corbeasca Hill at Izbășești (commune Stolnici, Romania).

See also
List of castra

Notes

External links
Roman castra from Romania - Google Maps / Earth

Roman legionary fortresses in Romania
History of Muntenia